Maëlle Guillaud is a French writer and editor. She was born in 1974. Lucie ou la vocation was her debut novel, followed by Une famille tres francaise.

References

French writers
1974 births
Living people
Place of birth missing (living people)
Date of birth missing (living people)
French editors
French women writers